RC Cannes is a French women's volleyball club based in Cannes and playing in the Ligue AF.

History
 was created as a sports club in 1922 and the volleyball department was introduced in 1942. Originally it had both men and women's teams until 1948 when the men's team was dissolved. The club played in regional and lower national leagues and when the national league was restructured in 1967, it gained a place in the elite league. The club proved to be competitive and after finishing second in 1972, it qualified for the first time to play in a European competition (Cup Winners Cup). In 1993, Chinese coach Yan Fang was hired and the club became very successful. For the next 23 seasons (from 1993–94 to 2015–16) under his coaching, the club won twenty French Championships (including eighteen consecutive titles from 1997–98 to 2014–15 and finish second in 1993–94, 1996–97 and 2015–16), nineteen French Cups (finish second in 1993–94, 1994–95, 2001–02 and 2014–15), two CEV Women's Champions League (in 2001–02 and 2002–03, finishing second in 2005–06 and 2011–12). The club has also won minor international tournaments, such as the Women's Top Volley International on six occasions (1990, December 1993, 1995, 1999, 2002 and 2005).

Venue
In 2005 the club moved from the Palais des Sports André Henry to the Palais des Victoires.

Honours

National competitions
  French Championship: 21
1994–95, 1995–96, 1997–98, 1998–99, 1999–00, 2000–01, 2001–02, 2002–03, 2003–04, 2004–05, 2005–06, 2006–07, 2007–08, 2008–09, 2009–10, 2010–11, 2011–12, 2012–13, 2013–14, 2014–15, 2018-19

  French Cup: 20
1995–96, 1996–97, 1997–98, 1998–99, 1999–00, 2000–01, 2002–03, 2003–04, 2004–05, 2005–06, 2006–07, 2007–08, 2008–09, 2009–10, 2010–11, 2011–12, 2012–13, 2013–14, 2015–16, 2017-18

International competitions
  CEV Champions League: 2
2001–02, 2002–03

Team
Season 2016–2017, as of March 2017.

Notable players

 Malgorzata Glinka (2005–2006)
 Simona Rinieri (2003–2004)
 Nadia Centoni (2007–2014)
 Valentina Fiorin (2008–2010)
 Cristina Pîrv (2004–2005)
 Luminiţa Trombiţaş (2009)
 Eva Yaneva (2005–2010)
 Strashimira Filipova (2006–2009)
 Jelena Nikolić (2004–2005)
 Milena Rašić (2010–2014)
 Victoria Ravva (1994–2015)
 Zhang Yuehong (2002–2003)
 Yuko Sano (2004–2006)
 Akiko Ino (2007–2009)
 Logan Tom (2014-2015)

References

External links

 Official website 

French volleyball clubs
Volleyball clubs established in 1922
1922 establishments in France
Women's volleyball in France
Sport in Cannes
Women's volleyball teams